Stourbridge RFC is a rugby union side based in Stourbridge, West Midlands and play in the fourth tier of the English rugby union league system; National League 2 West. They play their home games at Stourton Park, which was redeveloped in 2003 to provide a larger clubhouse and social area which can also be used for weddings and other functions. The ground is in the hamlet of Stourton set amongst the Staffordshire countryside, on the outskirts of the town of Stourbridge.

On 9 February 2023, the owners of Sixways Stadium announced that Stourbridge would be moving 20 miles to Worcester to replace Worcester Warriors as tenants following the Warriors disbandment, and be rebranding as "Sixways Rugby".

History
Stourbridge RFC was founded in 1876 as a branch of the Stourbridge Cricket Club and shared the cricket ground in Amblecote. As association football flourished, the rugby section was ousted and from 1883 rugby football soldiered on in a variety of locations throughout the town, with the highlight being a mini golden era in the two seasons 1887–88 and 1888–9 when only four games were lost out of a total of 37. Despite this success on the field of play, interest in the game seems to have waned and after two lacklustre seasons the club was forced to disband in 1893. There was a brief but inadequately supported revival in 1907–08.

The club was revived again in 1921, and yet again, it proved difficult to find a satisfactory location. Two remote spots in Clent and Pedmore were briefly utilised before they settled in an old soccer ground at Vicarage Road, Wollaston, rented from the Church. This remained their home for 43 years. Throughout this period, they benefited from a close connection with the local King Edward's Grammar School, which had introduced rugby into the curriculum nine years earlier. Until the breakup of the system, it was the Grammar School that produced the core of players, administrators and supporters that accounted for the prosperity of the club.

There was a memorable 1933–34 season when only two games were lost and apart from the inevitable break during the Second World War, the club has flourished ever since. So much so that only in four out of the 56 post-war seasons until entry to National 2 in 2001 did the club end up with a losing record. The most distinguished products of school and club were Bob Lloyd-Jones (Moseley), Huw Davies (Coventry and Wasps) and Peter Shillingford (Moseley).

In 1996–97, it completed a 450-seater grandstand. The clubhouse, a two-storey structure, has been extended and regularly refurbished so that it contains a gymnasium, a major clubroom, two members’ rooms and a viewing ledge, commonly known as “Banter Balcony” to the Stourbridge faithful. The tradition of regular improvement and repair probably reached its peak in 2002 with a £300,000 addition of twin towers to the clubhouse, improving and extending changing, administration and social facilities. A new set of floodlights were installed in 2007 on the first XV pitch. Club developments continued in 2016 when floodlights on the training pitch were upgraded and extended to cover both training pitches, providing further floodlight training capacity.

When the league system was introduced in 1987, Stourbridge were put in the National Leagues. Area League North in those days consisted of eleven teams and only involved ten fixtures a season. Stourbridge remained in that league for 15 years, the only club to do so, and then, at long last, were promoted to National 2 in 2001. They had flirted with promotion (but never with relegation) throughout that period, but their most spectacular achievements were in successive years 1998–99 and 1999–2000, when they ended up in a frustrating second place, playing attractive attacking rugby and smashing the league record for the number of tries a season, averaging well over 5 tries a game. Following that infamous law that dominates such situations, play–offs were introduced the following year. During their promotion season, Stourbridge maintained an unbeaten home record for the only time in its history.

Life in National 2 is so precarious that only four of the present fourteen clubs have been in the league for more than three seasons. Amongst all the NCA clubs, Stourbridge are unique in that they have only had one change (a promotion) in the twenty seasons of league history, While in National 2 they have faced the threat of relegation, being 11th twice but the last two seasons at 7th and 8th have achieved respectable mid-table positions. Neil Mitchell who had started and ended his playing career at Stourton Park, bordering a long spell at Moseley became Director of Rugby in 2004 and has attracted young player coaches, Marcus Cook for the backs and Jim Jenner for the pack. Both have distinguished playing records and are inspiring on and off the field. In June 2010, Stourbridge signed former South African international Thinus Delport as a player coach.

There is also a Minis and Juniors section for children aged 6–18.

Honours
1st team:
 North Midlands Cup winners (7): 1980–81, 1982–83, 1983–84, 1984–85, 1985–86, 1990–91, 1994–95
 National League 3 North champions: 2000–01

2nd team (Stourbridge Lions):
 North Midlands 3 champions: 2002–03
 North Midlands 2 champions: 2003–04
 North Midlands (South) 1 champions: 2004–05
 Midlands 4 West (South) champions: 2005–06
 Midlands 2 West (North) champions: 2016–17

Current standings

References

External links
 Official website

1876 establishments in England
English rugby union teams
Rugby clubs established in 1876
Sport in the West Midlands (county)
Stourbridge